D53 is a state road connecting Donji Miholjac, Našice and Slavonski Brod to Slavonski Brod border crossing to Bosnia and Herzegovina and to Donji Miholjac border crossing to Hungary. Furthermore, the road connects to D514 state road which in turn links to the A3 motorway Slavonski Brod - istok (east) interchange. The road is 91.7 km long.

Parts of D53 are concurrent with D2 and D38 state roads.

The road, as well as all other state roads in Croatia, is managed and maintained by Hrvatske ceste, a state-owned company.

Traffic volume 

Traffic is regularly counted and reported by Hrvatske ceste, operator of the road.

Road junctions and populated areas

Sources

D053
D053
D053
D053